Martin Cirque is a prominent cirque,  northwest of Mount Newall, in the Asgard Range, Antarctica. It occupies the south wall of Wright Valley between Denton Glacier and Nichols Ridge. It was named by the Advisory Committee on Antarctic Names (1997) after Craig J. Martin, who had 10 years involvement in Antarctic construction and engineering projects at Siple Station, South Pole Station, and McMurdo Station and various field camps in the McMurdo Dry Valleys from 1977. From 1989 he was Director, Engineering, of Antarctic Support Associates, with responsibility for the management of engineering, construction, and facilities maintenance efforts that directly support U.S. scientific research in Antarctica.

References

Cirques of Antarctica
Landforms of Victoria Land
McMurdo Dry Valleys